Attain is a management, technology, and strategy consulting firm based in McLean, Virginia. It serves the government, education, healthcare, and nonprofit markets.

History 
The company was founded in 2009 by Greg Baroni. The company is based in McLean, VA, with offices in Morrisville, NC, Arlington, VA, Washington, D.C., and Cranford, NJ. The company’s current president and a chief operating officer is Manish Agarwal. Attain offers different strategy and management services. It serves defense, civilian, national security, federal health, state and local government, academic medical centers, nonprofit organizations, colleges, universities, and research institutions. Attain partners with technology providers such as Oracle, Amazon Web Services, and Microsoft.

Awards 
In 2018, Attain won Contractor of the Year in the $75300 million category at the Greater Washington Government Contracting Awards.

References 

Companies based in McLean, Virginia
Information technology consulting firms of the United States
Management consulting firms of the United States
Consulting firms established in 2009
2009 establishments in Virginia
American companies established in 2009